There have been two baronetcies created for persons with the surname Prescott, one in the Baronetage of Great Britain and one in the Baronetage of the United Kingdom.

The Prescott Baronetcy, of Theobald's Park in the County of Hertford, was created in the Baronetage of Great Britain on 9 December 1794 for George William Prescott, son of George Prescott (c.1711 – 1790), MP, of Theobalds Park, Hertfordshire, and his wife Mary, daughter of Jacob Elton, a merchant and Mayor of Bristol, third son of Sir Abraham Elton, 1st Baronet. The Prescotts were an ancient Cheshire family. The title became extinct on the death of the seventh Baronet in 1959.

The Prescott Baronetcy, of Godmanchester in the County of Huntingdon, was created in the Baronetage of the United Kingdom on 30 June 1938 for William Prescott. He was a Colonel in the Army, represented Tottenham North in the House of Commons as a Coalition Conservative and served as Chairman of the Middlesex County Council. The third Baronet, who inherited from his uncle, is a racehorse trainer at Heath House Stables near Newmarket Racecourse.

Stanley Prescott, second and youngest son of the first Baronet and the father of the third Baronet, sat as Member of Parliament for Darwen from 1943 to 1951.

Prescott baronets, of Theobald's Park (1794)

Sir George William Prescott, 1st Baronet (1748–1801)
Sir George Beeston Prescott, 2nd Baronet (1775–1840)
Sir George William Prescott, 3rd Baronet (1800–1850)
Sir George Rendlesham Prescott, 4th Baronet (1846–1894)
Sir George Lionel Lawson Bagot Prescott, 5th Baronet (1875–1942)
Sir Charles William Beeston Prescott, 6th Baronet (1877–1955)
Sir William Villiers Leonard Prescott-Westcar, 7th Baronet (1882–1959)

Prescott baronets, of Godmanchester (1938)

Sir William Henry Prescott, 1st Baronet (1874–1945)
Sir Richard Stanley Prescott, 2nd Baronet (1899–1965)
Sir Mark Prescott, 3rd Baronet (born 1948)

There is no heir to the baronetcy.

References

 Kidd, Charles, Williamson, David (editors). Debrett's Peerage and Baronetage (1990 edition). New York: St Martin's Press, 1990.
 

Baronetcies in the Baronetage of the United Kingdom
Extinct baronetcies in the Baronetage of Great Britain